Strongyloides ardeae is a parasitic roundworm infecting the small intestine of yellow-crowned night heron, Nyctanassa violacea, and eastern green heron, Butorides virescens. It was first described from Louisiana.

References

Further reading
Boyd, Elizabeth M. "Observations on nematodes of herons in North America including three new species and new host and state records." The Journal of parasitology (1966): 503–511.
Schmidt, Gerold D., and Albert G. Canaris. "Acanthocephala from Kenya with descriptions of two new species." The Journal of parasitology (1967): 634–637.
Yoshino, Tomoo, et al. "First record of the genus Strongyloides (Nematoda; Rhabditoedea) obtained from a fairy pitta, Pitta brachyura nympha." Bull Tokushima Pref. Mus 22 (2012): 1–6.

External links 

Strongylidae
Parasitic nematodes of vertebrates
Parasites of birds
Nematodes described in 1966